Ankobra FM is a privately owned radio station in Axim in the Western Region of Ghana.  It was established by Kojo Armah.

References

Radio stations in Ghana
Western Region (Ghana)
Mass media in Ghana by city
Mass media in Ghana